Harold Ives (16 November 1904 – 23 November 1984) was a British rower. He competed in the men's coxed four event at the 1928 Summer Olympics.

References

1904 births
1984 deaths
British male rowers
Olympic rowers of Great Britain
Rowers at the 1928 Summer Olympics
Place of birth missing